Cholevinae is a subfamily of small carrion beetles in the family Leiodidae. There are more than 260 genera and 1,100 described species in Cholevinae.

See also
For a list of genera in Cholevinae, see List of Leiodidae genera.

References

Further reading

External links

 
 

Leiodidae